The Flag of the Hispanicity is a flag sometimes used to represent the Hispanic people or Hispanic community.

Symbolism
The Flag of the Hispanicity displays a white background with three purple crosses and a rising sun. 

The white field or background symbolizes peace and purity.
The golden Inti sun symbolizes the awakening of the new lands.
The three crosses pattée symbolize Christopher Columbus's three ships, the Niña, the Pinta, and the Santa María.
The Purpure color of the crosses represents the Spanish language and comes from the ancient use of this color in the lion of the Kingdom of León's flag, which was later incorporated with the Crown of Castile.

History

Alternative use as the Flag of the Americas

The flag is also sometimes occasionally alternately used to represent the entire geographical area of The Americas and not just as an ethnic flag of the Hispanic American people. The flag was officially adopted as the Flag of the Americasin this usage representing, besides Hispanic Americans, also Anglo-Americans, Franco-Americans (the Québécois, Haitians, Guadeloupians, Martininqians, and French Guianians), Luso-Americans, Dutch Americans (the inhabitants of the Dutch Antilles and Suriname), and  Greenlandersby all member countries of the Pan-American Conference at their Seventh Assembly in 1933.

See also
 Ethnic flag
 Hispanidad
 Hispanismo
 La Raza

Notes

References

Hispanic People
Hispanic People
Hispanic People
Hispanic people
Hispanic and Latino
Hispanidad